The 2022 season was the Philadelphia Eagles' 90th in the National Football League (NFL), their 20th playing home games at Lincoln Financial Field, their second under head coach Nick Sirianni, and seventh under general manager Howie Roseman since he returned to the position (twelfth overall). The Eagles started 8–0 for the first time in franchise history, before their winning streak was snapped with a 32–21 upset loss to the Washington Commanders in Week 10. They improved on their 9–8 record from last year after a 40–33 victory over the Green Bay Packers in Week 12. With a 48–22 road win over the division rival New York Giants in Week 14, the Eagles clinched their second straight playoff berth, and their fifth in six seasons. After a 25–20 road win over the Chicago Bears in Week 15, the Eagles matched their franchise-best 13–1 start in the 2004 season and secured their third 13-win season win in franchise history, after 2004 and 2017. With a 22–16 win over the Giants in Week 18, the Eagles won the NFC East for the first time since 2019, and clinched the NFC's #1 seed for the first time since 2017. The Eagles also reached 14 regular season wins, a franchise record.

In the Divisional Round, the Eagles routed the Giants 38–7 for their first postseason win since 2018. With this win, Philadelphia completed a 3-0 sweep of all three games played against New York, and advanced to the NFC Championship for the first time since 2017. The Eagles went on to win the NFC Championship against the San Francisco 49ers 31–7, advancing to Super Bowl LVII, their fourth Super Bowl appearance in franchise history, to face the Kansas City Chiefs and former longtime head coach Andy Reid. The Eagles lost to the Chiefs, 38–35.

Roster changes

Free agents

Signings

Departures

Trades

 April 28: The Eagles traded a first-round pick in the 2022 NFL Draft and a third-round pick in the 2022 NFL Draft to the Tennessee Titans for WR A. J. Brown.
August 15: The Eagles traded TE J. J. Arcega-Whiteside to the Seattle Seahawks for S Ugo Amadi.
August 24: The Eagles traded S Ugo Amadi and a seventh-round pick in the 2024 NFL Draft to the Tennessee Titans for a sixth-round pick in the 2024 NFL Draft.
August 30: The Eagles traded a fifth-round pick in the 2023 NFL Draft and a sixth-round pick in the 2024 NFL Draft to the New Orleans Saints for S C. J. Gardner-Johnson and a seventh-round pick in the 2025 NFL Draft.
August 31: The Eagles traded WR Jalen Reagor to the Minnesota Vikings for a seventh-round pick in the 2023 NFL Draft and a conditional fourth-round pick in the 2024 NFL Draft.
October 26: The Eagles traded a fourth-round pick in the 2023 NFL Draft to the Chicago Bears for DE Robert Quinn.

Draft

Draft trades

Staff

Final roster

Team captains

Jason Kelce (C)
Lane Johnson (T)
Jalen Hurts (QB)
Jake Elliott (K)
Darius Slay (CB)
Fletcher Cox (DT)
Brandon Graham (DE)

Preseason

Regular season

Schedule

Note: Intra-division opponents are in bold text.

Game summaries

Week 1: at Detroit Lions
For the third straight year, the Eagles were on the road to kick off the season. After the Lions scored on their opening drive, the Eagles would score 21 unanswered points. The Lions would try and rally with 21 points in the second half, but the Eagles would hang on and defeat the Lions for the second straight year. With the win, the Eagles started 1–0 for the ninth time since 2010 and for the second time under head coach Nick Sirianni.

Week 2: vs. Minnesota Vikings

This week 2 matchup was thought to see two high powered offenses go at it in a possible high scoring affair. However, only the Eagles would show off their high powered offense. The Eagles would receive the ball and march down the field finishing with a 3 yard Jalen Hurts touchdown. Kicking off the second quarter, Jalen Hurts would connect with Quez Watkins on a 53 yard touchdown to double Philadelphia's lead to 14–0. The Vikings would counter that with a touchdown pass from Kirk Cousins to Irv Smith Jr. Later in the second quarter, Jalen Hurts would scramble and power his way in for a 26 yard touchdown (the longest from an Eagles QB since Donovan McNabb in 2002). The Eagles would close out the second quarter with a Jake Elliott 38 yard field goal. In the second half, the Eagles defense would step up and shut down the Vikings offense. The only glimmers of hope for Minnesota were a blocked field goal in the third quarter and a fourth-quarter interception by former Eagle Jordan Hicks; in both instances, however, each of the ensuing Vikings drives ended in Eagles interceptions. Despite no second half points from either team, the Eagles looked to be the dominant team. The Eagles would go on to win and have their first 2–0 start since 2016. Furthermore, this game was by far Jalen Hurts' best performance throwing the ball and claimed by many media members his possible "breakout game." Jalen would finish 26 of 31 for 333 yards 3 total touchdowns and 1 interception with a passer rating of 108.7.

Week 3: at Washington Commanders

In his first time facing the Eagles since being traded away from them, Carson Wentz was sacked 9 times and the Commanders only had 47 total yards of offense in the first half. Jalen Hurts threw for 300 yards in back-to-back games and threw touchdown passes to Dallas Goedert, A. J. Brown, and DeVonta Smith in the second quarter. The third touchdown to Smith to make the score 24–0 was on the last play of the 1st half on 4th and Goal from the 1-yard line. Smith finished with 8 receptions for 169 yards, and the Eagles won 24–8. They became the first NFC team to hit the 3–0 mark and was the first time they accomplished that feat in six years.

Week 4: vs. Jacksonville Jaguars

The Eagles hosted the Jacksonville Jaguars in a reunion with former Eagles head coach, Doug Pederson. Philadelphia entered the game as the lone unbeaten team in the league following the Miami Dolphins' loss to the Cincinnati Bengals the previous Thursday. The Jaguars jumped out to a quick 14–0 lead following a pick six by Andre Cisco and a 4 yard touchdown reception by Jamal Agnew. The Eagles rebounded with a dominant second quarter to take a 20–14 lead on touchdown runs by Jalen Hurts, Miles Sanders, and Kenneth Gainwell. The defense would also stymie Jacksonville throughout the game, forcing an interception and four Trevor Lawrence fumbles, including one that snuffed out any hope of a Jaguars comeback. With the 29–21 win, the Eagles improved to 4–0 for the first time since the 2004 season.

Also with this win, Philadelphia defeated Jacksonville for the fourth straight time. The Eagles took their first-ever lead in their all-time series with the Jaguars: now leading 4–3 after initially trailing 0–3.

Week 5: at Arizona Cardinals

The Eagles withstood a late rally by the Cardinals and improved to 5–0 on the season. This was Philadelphia's first win in Arizona since the 2001 season, as well as their first ever win at State Farm Stadium.

Week 6: vs. Dallas Cowboys

The Eagles continued their 2nd quarter dominance, scoring 20 points on four consecutive drives. The Cowboys offense battled back in the 2nd half scoring touchdowns on two long drives to cut the deficit to 20–17, but DeVonta Smith scored a touchdown to make it a two-score game again. Cooper Rush threw his third interception, with the following drive leading to a missed field goal attempt. The Eagles ran out the clock and won 26–17. This was the Eagles' first win against the Cowboys since 2020, their first with Hurts at starting QB and Sirianni as head coach. They also started 6–0 for the third time in franchise history.

Week 8: vs. Pittsburgh Steelers
 
With this win, the Eagles matched their franchise best 7–0 start in 2004.

Week 9: at Houston Texans

This was played the same day as Game 5 of the 2022 World Series between the Houston Astros and the Philadelphia Phillies, moved back by one day due to rain in Philadelphia earlier in the week. Estimates from Nielsen Media Research show the baseball game drew an average of five million more viewers, with a share of at least 50 in both Philadelphia and Houston. Meanwhile, the football game, originally scheduled to air on the Fox affiliates in both markets per NFL rules, moved to the MyNetworkTV affiliates in both markets.

Week 10: vs. Washington Commanders

The Eagles welcomed the surging Washington Commanders to Philadelphia for a rematch of their Week 3 meeting. Philadelphia started strong early, but the tables would turn in the second quarter once Washington got their run game going. The Commanders rallied behind a dominant ground attack and a lights-out defense, outscoring the Eagles 25–7 over the final three quarters to hand Philadelphia its first defeat of the season in a 32–21 upset. With the stunning loss, the Eagles fell to 8–1 and failed to become the first NFL team to start a season 9–0 since the Steelers did two seasons ago, who coincidentally also faced their first loss to Washington, who were then the Washington Football Team. Despite this loss, Philadelphia still tied a franchise record for their best start at 8–1.

Week 11: at Indianapolis Colts

This was head coach Nick Sirianni's first return to Indianapolis since leaving the team in January 2021 to become the Eagles' head coach. Sirianni previously served as the Colts' offensive coordinator under then-head coach Frank Reich from 2018 to 2020, appearing in the playoffs twice in that span, and Sirianni's last game was the 2020 AFC Wild Card game, which was a 27–24 loss to the Buffalo Bills. After trailing 13–3 through three quarters, the Eagles rallied in the fourth quarter to stun the Colts 17–16. This victory marked the first time the Eagles won a game after trailing by 10 or more points entering the fourth quarter since 2010. The Eagles improved to 9–1, matching their win total from 2018, 2019, and 2021, and matching their best record through 10 games set in 1949, 1960, 1980, 2004, and 2017.

Week 12: vs. Green Bay Packers

The Eagles put up 363 rushing yards against Green Bay, with both Jalen Hurts and Miles Sanders rushing for over 100 yards each. While the Eagles defense gave up 33 points to the Packers, they intercepted Aaron Rodgers twice. Rodgers exited the game in the third quarter due to an injury and was replaced by Jordan Love, who threw a 63-yard touchdown to rookie wide receiver Christian Watson. The Eagles would clinch the victory with a 54-yard field goal from Jake Elliott. With the win, the Eagles improved to 10–1 (their first double digit win season since 2017) and maintained their lead in the NFC.

Week 13: vs. Tennessee Titans
 A. J. Brown dominated his former team for 119 yards and 2 touchdowns on 8 receptions. Philadelphia's defense held Titans star running back Derrick Henry to just 30 yards on the day. With the win, the Eagles improved to 11–1, their best start in 12 games since 2004.

Week 14: at New York Giants

The Eagles improved to 12–1, clinching their second consecutive playoff berth, and their best start since 2004. The 48 points scored by the Eagles were the most since 2017 versus the Broncos.

Week 15: at Chicago Bears
The Eagles would go on to win their 13th game for the third time in franchise history (2017, 2004 prior) and their best start since 2004. After a shaky start with 2 interceptions, Jalen Hurts would settle in throwing for 315 yards and scoring 3 touchdowns. Those touchdowns would tie the most total touchdowns (35) by a quarterback in a season. A day after the game, it was revealed that Hurts had sprained his shoulder late in the third quarter. Impressively, Hurts went 6/9 for 102 yards and 104.9 rating with a sprained shoulder.

Week 16: at Dallas Cowboys

Backup quarterback Gardner Minshew started the Eagles' road finale against the arch-rival Cowboys in place of Jalen Hurts, who was sitting out due to the shoulder injury he sustained the prior week against Chicago. Despite a solid performance by Minshew, Philadelphia was doomed by a season-high four turnovers, all of which led to scoring drives for Dallas, in what turned out to be a high-scoring slugfest. Trailing 40–34 late in the game, Minshew attempted to lead the Eagles on a go-ahead drive into Cowboys territory, but a fourth-down pass would fall incomplete, sealing Philadelphia's first and ultimately only road loss of the season. With the loss, the Eagles fell to 13–2.

Week 17: vs. New Orleans Saints

The Eagles returned home, seeking to clinch the NFC East for the first time since 2019 and the number 1 seed for the first time since 2017. However, they were instead dealt their second straight defeat in a defensive slugfest with a red-hot New Orleans Saints team. After falling behind 13–0 at halftime, Philadelphia pulled within three points of New Orleans with a ten-point third quarter, but their momentum would be halted with a Marshon Lattimore pick-six in the fourth quarter. With the 20–10 upset loss, the Eagles dropped to 13–3 on the year, and now need either a Week 18 win against the New York Giants or a Dallas Cowboys loss to clinch the division. It was the first since the 2018 season that Philadelphia was defeated by New Orleans.

Week 18: vs. New York Giants

Jalen Hurts returned to the Eagles' lineup against the New York Giants after missing the previous two games to a shoulder injury. Philadelphia would secure the NFC East division and the NFC's top seed behind five field goals by Jake Elliott and a rushing touchdown by Boston Scott. With the 22–16 victory, their ninth straight at home against the Giants, the Eagles finished the regular season with a 14–3 record, and set a franchise high for most regular season wins in a season.

Standings

Division

Conference

Postseason

Schedule

Game summaries

NFC Divisional Playoffs: vs. (6) New York Giants
The Eagles met their division rival, the New York Giants in the Divisional playoff game. Behind a running game that produced 268 yards on 44 carries, as well as seeing the defense force a turnover with an interception by former New York Giant, James Bradberry, the Eagles won that game convincingly, and advanced to the NFC Championship, their first since the Super Bowl-winning 2017 season.

NFC Championship: vs. (2) San Francisco 49ers
The Eagles hosted the San Francisco 49ers in the NFC Championship Game. It was the first season since 2017 that the Eagles would host the conference title game. While this game featured two of the league's top offenses, it was the play of both defensive units (with the 49ers ranked first and the Eagles ranked second in the NFC) that controlled the majority of the game. A critical fourth-down conversion throw from Jalen Hurts to Devonta Smith allowed the Eagles to post the game's first score on a touchdown run by Miles Sanders on the initial drive. The 49ers' first drive ended early when Eagles linebacker Haason Reddick was able to force a fumble on an attempted throw by rookie quarterback Brock Purdy. Purdy suffered a UCL injury on the play, hampering his ability to throw the ball for the remainder of the game. Fourth-string quarterback Josh Johnson took over for San Francisco, but proved to be largely ineffective against the Eagles' defense, completing 7 of 13 passes for 74 yards and losing a fumble before he too was knocked out of the game, suffering from concussion symptoms on a play made by Ndamukong Suh. 

The 49ers were able to limit Jalen Hurts to just 121 yards passing on 15 of 25 throws, sacking him once. However, the combination of short fields given to the offense by the turnovers created by the defense, three fumble recoveries, and their reliance on their running game against the league-best run defense proved to be the difference. Philadelphia ran the ball for 44 carries, totaling 148 yards for the day, and scored all four touchdowns on rushes, with two touchdowns coming from Miles Sanders, a 10-yard touchdown run just before halftime by Boston Scott, and a 1-yard quarterback sneak for a touchdown by Hurts. San Francisco's lone score of the game came on a 23-yard touchdown run by Christian McCaffrey, as he broke through several tackles to then tie the game at 7–7. However, the second touchdown by Sanders and Boston Scott's touchdown run after Johnson's fumble put the Eagles up 21–7 at halftime.

With no quarterback healthy enough to throw, the 49ers were forced to rely on the run game in the second half. While Purdy re-entered the game after Johnson's injury, he showed no signs that he could launch the ball through the air. Hurts's touchdown gave the Eagles a 28–7 lead midway through the fourth quarter. After a Jake Elliott field goal increased the Eagles' lead to 31–7 and with less than 5 minutes left to play, 49ers left tackle Trent Williams slammed Eagles safety K'Von Wallace to the ground, causing a brawl between the teams. This resulted in both Williams and Wallace being ejected from the game. The Eagles secured the victory after play resumed. With the win, Philadelphia reached the Super Bowl for the first time since Super Bowl LII, in which they defeated the New England Patriots to capture the franchise's first Lombardi Trophy. The win would also mark the franchise's fourth overall NFC Championship and their third since 2000, all of which were won at Lincoln Financial Field.

Super Bowl LVII: vs. (A1) Kansas City Chiefs

Despite strong offensive performance, the Eagles could not contain Patrick Mahomes and the Chiefs offense. Their defense allowed the most points since Week 16 against the Cowboys, as well as lost their first game outside of Philadelphia since then. With the loss, the Eagles are ensured their third Super Bowl loss in four appearances.

Awards and honors

References

External links
 

Philadelphia
Philadelphia Eagles seasons
Philadelphia Eagles
NFC East championship seasons
National Football Conference championship seasons